Samantha Shannon (born 8 November 1991) is a British author of dystopian and fantasy fiction. Her debut novel, The Bone Season, was published in 2013 and is the first of a seven-book series.

Life and career
Shannon was born in Hammersmith, London in November 1991 and grew up in Ruislip. She first began writing at the age of fifteen, when she wrote her first novel, Aurora, which remains unpublished. Shannon studied English Language and Literature at St Anne's College, Oxford and graduated in 2013. She is of Irish descent on her father's side, her ancestors emigrating to England from County Roscommon.

In 2012 she signed a six-figure book deal with Bloomsbury Publishing, who bid following the London Book Fair, to publish the first three books in a seven-book series, beginning with The Bone Season. Set in 2059, it follows Paige Mahoney, a 'dreamwalker' resisting the Republic of Scion, which has led an oppressive campaign against clairvoyants for two centuries. Following its publication, Shannon was compared favorably to J.K. Rowling. Film and TV rights to The Bone Season were first optioned by The Imaginarium Studios in November 2012, with Andy Serkis slated to produce, and by British production company Lunar Park in 2019.

The Priory of the Orange Tree, a standalone high fantasy by Shannon, was published in February 2019 by Bloomsbury Publishing. A reimagining of the legend of Saint George and the Dragon, it was named by Collider as a sapphic book that should be turned into a show or movie. A prequel, A Day of Fallen Night, will be published in February 2023. Shannon has called the series The Roots of Chaos, having originally planned to only write one book within the universe and later stating that there were more stories to tell. 

In 2022, Shannon signed a contract for a third book in the Roots of Chaos cycle and a story inspired by the Greek goddess Iris.

Personal life
Shannon identifies as "sapphic". She lives in London.

Bibliography

The Bone Season series 

The Bone Season (2013)
The Mime Order (2015)
The Song Rising (2017)
The Mask Falling (2021)

Related works

On the Merits of Unnaturalness (2015)
The Pale Dreamer (2016)
The Dawn Chorus (2020)

Roots of Chaos

The Priory of the Orange Tree (2019)
A Day of Fallen Night (2023)

Short stories 
Amrita (2013)
"Marigold" in Because You Love to Hate Me: 13 Tales of Villainy, edited by Amerie (2017)

References

External links
 
 

Living people
1991 births
People from Hammersmith
Alumni of St Anne's College, Oxford
English women novelists
English fantasy writers
Women science fiction and fantasy writers
Queer women
Queer writers
English LGBT writers